Samdech Euv High School is the name of five different high school's campuses in Cambodia.

Norodom Sihanouk or Norodom Sihanuvarman was affectionately known as "Samdech Euv" to most Cambodians. ("Samdech Euv" is a Khmer title which translates as the King Father in English.)

Schools
Samdech Euv High School is next to Phumĭ Thnál and is located in Khétt Siĕm Réab.
Samdech Euv High School is located in Sangkat Bei, Krong Preah Sihanouk.
Samdech Euv High School is located in Svay Por commune in Battambang province in western Cambodia.
Samdech Euv High School is located in Banteay Meanchey province.  It is situated on the hill of Phnum Svay Mountain along National Road 6 from Siem Reap Province to Poipet. The school was founded in 1956 by Preah Bat Norodom Sihanu Varaman. It is the largest school in the province.
Samdech Euv Secondary School is located in Village 2, Sangkat 3 of Preah Sihanouk town of the Preah Sihanouk province.  It was built by the D.K. Kim Cambodia Foundation, 2012.  Further development was completed in 2015.

References

Books
 
 

Schools in Cambodia